Red Doe, also known as the Evander Gregg House, is a historic home located near Florence, Florence County, South Carolina.  It was built about 1840, and is a one-story, rectangular frame farmhouse on a raised brick basement foundation. It has a central hall plan, a two-room rear ell on the rear, and low-pitched gable roof. The front façade features six solid octagonal wooden piers support the porch roof and full-width verandah.  Also on the property is a small frame building that appears to have been used as an office or store.

It was listed on the National Register of Historic Places in 1982.

References

Houses on the National Register of Historic Places in South Carolina
Houses completed in 1840
Houses in Florence County, South Carolina
National Register of Historic Places in Florence County, South Carolina
Buildings and structures in Florence, South Carolina